Praga Khan Sampler is a sampler EP by the Belgian techno artist Praga Khan. It was released along with the first releases of Lords of Acid's Expand Your Head.

Track listing
 "Supersonic Lovetoy" - 3:24	
 "Lonely" - 5:33	
 "Injected with a Poison (Original Version)" - 5:03	
 "My Mind is My Enemy" - 4:12	
 "Jazz Trippin'" - 7:02

References

1999 EPs
Praga Khan albums